Lionel Teixido (born 26 September 1979) is a French former professional rugby league footballer who played in the 2000s, he played for the Catalans Dragons in the Super League competition.

References

1979 births
Living people
Catalans Dragons players
French rugby league players
Rugby league hookers